Lower Little Swatara Creek is a tributary of Swatara Creek in southern Schuylkill County, Pennsylvania, US. The creek starts on Blue Mountain and flows west-southwest into Swatara Creek near the community of Pine Grove. Fishing and canoeing are the primary recreational activities on the creek. Significant amounts of phosphorus and sediment flow through the creek.

Course
Lower Little Swatara Creek starts on the northern slopes of Blue Mountain in Wayne Township, near the Schuylkill/Berks county line. The creek flows northwest to the community of Moyers, at which point it turns west-southwest into Washington Township. As the creek enters Washington Township, parallels Blue Mountain, as well as briefly paralleling Summer Hill. It picks up two tributaries from the south, then one from the northeast, then one each from the south and north. The creek's valley gets wider as it flows out of Washington Township and into Pine Grove Township. As it enters the township, it flows between Swope Mountain to the south and Swatara Hill to the north. The creek passes by the communities of Marstown and Crowtown, as well as a sewage disposal station. At this point, the creek empties into Swatara Creek.

Tributaries
Lower Little Swatara Creek has several tributaries. Three of them are unnamed.

Geography
Lower Little Swatara Creek is in the ridge and valley province's Appalachian Mountain Section. The headwaters of Lower Little Swatara Creek are  higher in elevation than its mouth.

Geology
The Shawangunk Formation is one of the main types of rock formations in the Lower Little Swatara Creek watershed. This formation occurs in the southern part of the watershed, on Blue Mountain. Slightly further north is the Bloomsburg Formation, which occupies the northern edge of Blue Mountain. The Hamilton Group is north of the Bloomsburg Formation. The Hamilton Group occupies the central region of the watershed, including the Lower Little Swatara Creek valley. The Trimmers Rock Formation is another formation in the creek's watershed. It occupies the area north of Lower Little Swatara Creek itself. A rock formation known as the Walcksville and Towanmensing Member occurs in a small band north of the Trimmers Rock Formation. The Beaverdam Run Member formation occurs on the edges of the watershed of the largest tributary of the creek. The Long Run Member formation occurs around this creek itself.

There are several main types of soil in the Lower Little Swatara Creek watershed. They are the Berks-Weikert-Beddington, the Leck Kill-Minersville-Calvin, and the Hazleton-Dechaub-Buchanon. The Hazleton-Dechaub-Buchanon soil occurs in most of the southern part of the watershed. The Leck Kill-Minersville-Calvin soil occurs in the east-central part of the watershed, including the upper part of the Lower Little Swatara Creek valley, and also the northeastern corner. The Berks-Weikert-Beddington occurs in the lower part of the creek's valley, as well as most of the watershed north of the valley.

Watershed
Lower Little Swatara Creek has a watershed that is 34 square miles in area. 64% of the land in the watershed is agricultural land. 29% of the land is covered by forest and 7% of the land is developed.

In particular, the watershed of Lower Little Swatara Creek contains 2901 acres of hay or pastures. The watershed contains 1378.8 acres of cropland and 1912.6 acres of forest. There are 430 acres of low-intensity development, 37.1 acres of land in transition, and 4.9 acres of wetland.

Hydrology
This is approximately 1.89 times the total maximum daily load for the creek. This is approximately 1.78 times the total maximum daily load.

In Lower Little Swatara Creek, dissolved phosphorus makes up 25% to 33% of the total phosphorus concentration and phosphorus in sediment makes up 67% to 75%, as of 1985.

Lower Little Swatara Creek's outflow into Swatara Creek helps dilute acid mine drainage in Swatara Creek.

The maximum concentration of manganese in the waters of Lower Little Swatara Creek 670 micrograms per liter, as of 1985. The median concentration of iron in the waters of the creek was 850 micrograms per liter as of 1985. The concentration of dissolved iron in the creek near Pine Grove was 85 micrograms per liter.

History
There was a gauging station on Lower Little Swatara Creek from 1936 to 1953. The Pennsylvania Department of Environmental Protection conducted a public TMDL meeting for Lower Little Swatara Creek for the first time on June 16, 2010, making it one of the first public TMDL meetings in the state.

Recreation
It is possible to navigate Lower Little Swatara Creek in a canoe. The Pennsylvania Fish and Boat Commission also stocks trout in some areas of the creek. Public fishing is permitted on the creek.

See also
Little Swatara Creek

References 

Tributaries of Swatara Creek
Rivers of Schuylkill County, Pennsylvania
Rivers of Pennsylvania